Kenny is a 2006 Australian mockumentary film starring Shane Jacobson as Kenny Smyth, a Melbourne plumber who works for a portable toilet rental company. The film was followed by the television series Kenny's World.

Director Clayton Jacobson describes the character of Kenny as "'The Dalai-Lama' of Waste Management, eternally optimistic and always ready to put others before himself. Kenny represents the humbling nature of common decency." The film was shot entirely on location in the western suburbs of Melbourne, Victoria and Nashville, Tennessee in the United States.

The film was released in the United Arab Emirates and the United Kingdom on 28 September 2007.

Plot
Kenny is a mockumentary that follows the fictional Kenny through his daily life. His work and his personal relationships are explored as Kenny goes about his day-to-day activities and speaks directly to the camera and his audience. Kenny provides a most basic service to the community, portable toilets.

The audience sees Kenny interviewing potential clients and involved in major public events. It is important to Kenny to know the kind of food and drink to be served at these events as this will determine the level of service he provides. Never ashamed of his job, despite the disparagement of some (including his own family), Kenny regards himself as a professional. Even at the most prestigious events for which he caters, Kenny realises that the most glamorous will need his portable toilets.

He sees life in all of its complexities through the need of his services. Kenny takes his son, Jesse, to visit his father, but is hampered by his ex-wife's obstructiveness and his father's bitterness.

When Kenny travels to Nashville to attend a toilet convention, he is thrilled to travel outside his native Melbourne. His ingenuity, friendship and commitment to his profession opens business opportunities in Japan and the potential for a new relationship with Jackie, a flight attendant, but he must return home prematurely when his father suffers a medical emergency.

In an attempt at bonding, Kenny, his wealthy brother David and their father go camping. After half a day, David leaves in disdain. After Kenny tries to defend David, his father tells Kenny to step out of his brothers shadow and stick up for himself, which prompts Kenny to consider his life. He reveals that his success in Nashville has led to the offer of a promotion, and though his father urges him to accept, Kenny is unsure.

When Kenny's ex-wife unexpectedly leaves him with Jesse on the day of the Melbourne Cup, his busiest day of the year, Kenny finds his son to be an able and cheerful assistant. However, prejudice against his work again appears, with customers complaining that a child should not be made to clean toilets, prompting Kenny to ask Jesse to stay in the office. When he returns to find Jesse gone, Kenny searches the venue in a panic and eventually finds him at the toilets, wanting to help again.

That night, as he is about to drive away in his septic tank truck after a long and exhausting day, Kenny's way is blocked by a luxury car whose driver insensitively brushes off his requests to move. Kenny breaks his longstanding habit of amiability to fill the man's car with human waste, a suggestion that perhaps Kenny has decided to stick up for himself a little bit more. Finally, Kenny declines the opportunity to become an executive and seeks out Jackie to renew their relationship.

Cast
 Shane Jacobson as Kenny Smyth
 Eve von Bibra as Jackie Sheppard
 Clayton Jacobson as David Smyth
 Ronald Jacobson as Bill Smyth
 Jesse Jacobson as Jesse Smyth
 Morihiko Hasebe as Sushi Cowboy
 Vicki Musso as Kenny's ex-wife and Ringless Woman
 Glenn Preusker as Glenn
 Chris Davis as Pat
 Ian Dryden as Sammy
 Mark Robertson as Robbo
 Alf Scerri as Alf
 Jason Gann as Drunk Guy at Melbourne Cup
 Nash Edgerton as Golf Cart Victim

World premiere
In line with the theme of the film, its first screening was held in the Victorian country town of Poowong.

Reception
Kenny received positive reviews. Rotten Tomatoes reports that all 25 reviews listed gave the film positive feedback, with an average review score of 7.60 out of 10. The site's consensus reads: "Kenny uses its seemingly lowbrow mockumentary premise as the foundation for a well-acted and surprisingly thoughtful character study". Jake Wilson in the Melbourne Age lauded the film as "the best Australian comedy in a very long time"; Megan Spencer of Triple J called Kenny "... a lot of fun and a good stab at a mock-doc ... a good-natured, crowd-pleasing comedy about ordinary life that outranks perennial 'ordinary Aussie bloke' yardstick, The Castle. She also praised the film's technical accomplishment, describing it as "a triumph, superbly shot, edited and directed by Clayton Jacobson – probably surpassing most Australian movies with its command of film language, shot on HD video to boot".<ref>[http://www.abc.net.au/triplej/review/film/s1717927.htm Megan Spencer, Kenny" review, Triple J, 17 August 2006 (Retrieved 12 March 2016)]</ref> Margaret Pomeranz from At the Movies awarded the film a score of 4.5 out of 5. In contrast, however, David Stratton gave the film 2.5 out of 5 stars, criticising the cinematography and overused humour.

Awards

Kenny's World

A television mockumentary series developed with Network Ten, Kenny's World, aired as part of Ten's second-half lineup of 2008. The series takes Kenny on a toilet tour of the globe. The show also features cameos of characters from the movie.

Appearances in other media
Jacobson has reprised his performance as Kenny in Australian shows including 20 to 01 and The Panel Christmas Wrap 2006.

Box officeKenny'' grossed $7,778,177 at the box office in Australia.

See also
Cinema of Australia

References

External links
 Official website
 
 
 Hoyts Cinemas film review
 Kenny: The Movie Trailer on YouTube
 Kenny at the National Film and Sound Archive

2006 films
Australian comedy films
2000s mockumentary films
Films set in Melbourne
Films set in Tennessee
Films shot in Melbourne
Films shot in Tennessee
2000s English-language films